Kunturi (Aymara qullqi silver, ri a suffix, Hispanicized spellings Collquere, Collqueri,  Collquire, Collquiri, Colquere, Colquiri) may refer to:

 Qullqiri (Arequipa), a mountain in the Arequipa Region, Peru
 Qullqiri (Cusco), a mountain in the Cusco Region, Peru
 Colquiri, a town in the La Paz Department, Bolivia
 Colquiri Municipality, a municipality in the La Paz Department, Bolivia